Several Canadian naval units have been named HMCS Montreal.

  (I), a  that served in the Royal Canadian Navy during the Battle of the Atlantic. In service 1943 to 1945 and scrapped 1947.
  (II), a  commissioned in 1994.

Battle honours
Atlantic, 1944–45.
Arabian Sea

See also

References
 Directory of History and Heritage – HMCS Montréal 

Royal Canadian Navy ship names